Elections to Lisburn Borough Council were held on 17 May 1989 on the same day as the other Northern Irish local government elections. The election used four district electoral areas to elect a total of 28 councillors.

Election results

Note: "Votes" are the first preference votes.

Districts summary

|- class="unsortable" align="centre"
!rowspan=2 align="left"|Ward
! % 
!Cllrs
! % 
!Cllrs
! % 
!Cllrs
! %
!Cllrs
! % 
!Cllrs
! %
!Cllrs
!rowspan=2|TotalCllrs
|- class="unsortable" align="center"
!colspan=2 bgcolor="" | UUP
!colspan=2 bgcolor="" | DUP
!colspan=2 bgcolor="" | SDLP
!colspan=2 bgcolor="" | Alliance
!colspan=2 bgcolor="" | Sinn Féin
!colspan=2 bgcolor="white"| Others
|-
|align="left"|Downshire
|bgcolor="40BFF5"|56.1
|bgcolor="40BFF5"|4
|32.3
|2
|0.0
|0
|10.8
|1
|0.0
|0
|0.8
|0
|7
|-
|align="left"|Dunmurry Cross
|26.4
|2
|10.7
|1
|18.1
|2
|7.6
|0
|bgcolor="#008800"|28.7
|bgcolor="#008800"|2
|8.5
|0
|7
|-
|align="left"|Killultagh
|bgcolor="40BFF5"|52.9
|bgcolor="40BFF5"|4
|17.7
|1
|10.9
|1
|7.6
|0
|0.0
|0
|10.9
|1
|7
|-
|align="left"|Lisburn Town
|bgcolor="40BFF5"|68.8
|bgcolor="40BFF5"|5
|10.3
|1
|0.0
|0
|18.9
|1
|0.0
|0
|2.0
|0
|7
|-
|- class="unsortable" class="sortbottom" style="background:#C9C9C9"
|align="left"| Total
|49.9
|15
|17.8
|5
|8.0
|3
|10.7
|2
|7.6
|2
|6.0
|1
|28
|-
|}

Districts results

Downshire

1985: 3 x UUP, 3 x DUP, 1 x Alliance
1989: 4 x UUP, 2 x DUP, 1 x Alliance
1985-1989 Change: UUP gain from DUP

Dunmurry Cross

1985: 2 x Sinn Féin, 2 x UUP, 1 x SDLP, 1 x DUP, 1 x Alliance
1989: 2 x Sinn Féin, 2 x UUP, 2 x SDLP, 1 x DUP
1985-1989 Change: SDLP gain from Alliance

Killultagh

1985: 4 x UUP, 2 x DUP, 1 x SDLP
1989: 4 x UUP, 1 x DUP, 1 x SDLP, 1 x Independent Conservative
1985-1989 Change: Independent Conservative gain from DUP

Lisburn Town

1985: 4 x UUP, 2 x DUP, 1 x Alliance
1989: 5 x UUP, 1 x DUP, 1 x Alliance
1985-1989 Change: UUP gain from DUP

References

Lisburn City Council elections
Lisburn